"Tire Me" is a song by American rock band Rage Against the Machine from their album Evil Empire. Although "Tire Me" never had a music video, was never released on any media formats, and had no radio airplay, the song won a Grammy Award in 1997 for the Best Metal Performance.

References

1996 songs
Rage Against the Machine songs
Grammy Award for Best Metal Performance
Songs written by Zack de la Rocha
Songs written by Tim Commerford
Songs written by Tom Morello
Songs written by Brad Wilk
Rapcore songs